Martina Navratilova and Pam Shriver were the defending champions, but Navratilova did not compete this year. Shriver teamed up with Manon Bollegraf and lost in first round to Debbie Graham and Brenda Schultz.

Katrina Adams and Zina Garrison-Jackson won the title by defeating Amy Frazier and Kimberly Po 7–6(9–7), 6–3 in the final.

Seeds

Draw

Draw

References
 Official results archive (ITF) 
 Official results archive (WTA)

Ameritech Cup
1993 WTA Tour
1993 in American tennis
1993 in sports in Illinois